David George Herd (15 April 1934 – 1 October 2016) was a Scottish international footballer who played for Arsenal, Manchester United, Stockport County, and Stoke City. His regular position was as a forward where he was a consistent goal scorer.

Playing career

Stockport County
Herd was born in Hamilton, Lanarkshire but grew up in Manchester as his father Alex was playing for Manchester City and later Stockport County where Herd Jr. began his career. He made his debut on the final day of the 1950–51 season with his father and he scored as County beat Hartlepools United 2–0. His appearances for Stockport were limited by his national service duties. He scored five goals in 12 games in 1953–54 and he attracted the attentions of First Division clubs.

Arsenal
Herd did well enough to attract the attention of Arsenal, who signed him for £10,000 in 1954. Herd made his Arsenal debut on 19 February 1955 against Leicester City. Herd continued to be a bit part player, playing just eight games in his first two seasons at the club, before making his breakthrough in 1956–57, scoring 18 goals in 28 games that season. From then on he was an established goalscorer, being the club's top goalscorer for four seasons straight, from 1956–57 through to 1960–61 – when he hit 29 goals, the most by an Arsenal player since Ronnie Rooke.

However, Arsenal's poor form meant they were nowhere near winning a trophy, the closest coming was a third place in the league in 1958–59. Despite being top scorer in 1960–61, Herd was unsettled at Arsenal due to their lack of success, and he moved to Manchester United in July 1961 for £35,000. In all he scored 107 goals for Arsenal in 180 appearances, making him the club's 15th highest goalscorer.

Manchester United
His first game for United came against West Ham United on 19 August 1961. Herd helped the club to the 1962–63 FA Cup, scoring two goals in the final itself against Leicester City. He also helped them to win the English league championship in 1965 and 1967,.

His first team appearances were limited after he suffered a broken leg in March 1967. Herd was part of the squad that won the 1967–68 European Cup, but he was not selected for the final on 29 May 1968. In all, he scored 145 career goals in 265 appearances (including one substitute appearance), an average of 0.54 goals per game and is currently 13th on the all-time club goalscorers list. He also once scored past three different goalkeepers in one match on 26 November 1966 against Sunderland, as United won the game 5–0.

Stoke City
He left Manchester United in July 1968 for Stoke City on a free transfer. He played 39 games for Stoke in 1968–69 scoring nine goals as Stoke had a poor season narrowly avoiding relegation. In 1969–70 Herd made nine appearances scoring twice and was released at the end of the season.

Waterford United
In December 1970 Herd signed for Shay Brennan at Waterford. He made his league of Ireland debut at Kilcohan Park on 14 December.

International career
He won his first cap for Scotland, on 18 October 1958 against Wales at Ninian Park; Scotland won 3–0. Herd won five caps in total for Scotland between 1958 and 1961, scoring three goals, his last cap coming in a 4–0 defeat by Czechoslovakia on 14 May 1961.

Managerial career
After retiring from playing, he had a stint managing Lincoln City between 1971 and 1972.

Personal life
Born in Hamilton, Lanarkshire, Herd was the son of former Manchester City player Alec Herd and the nephew of Scottish international Sandy Herd.

He died on 1 October 2016. Players of former clubs Manchester United and Stoke City wore black arm bands when they played each other the next day. His small, family funeral on 14 October at Middlebie in Dumfriesshire was in the same cemetery as his parents who spent their latter years living in Ecclefechan.

Career statistics

Club

A.  The "Other" column constitutes appearances and goals in the FA Charity Shield.

International

Honours

Manchester United
European Cup: 1967–68
Football League First Division: 1964–65, 1966–67
FA Cup: 1962–63
FA Charity Shield: 1965

See also
List of footballers in England by number of league goals (200+)

References
 Specific

 General

External links
 

1934 births
2016 deaths
Scottish footballers
Scotland international footballers
Stockport County F.C. players
Arsenal F.C. players
Manchester United F.C. players
Stoke City F.C. players
Waterford F.C. players
English Football League players
League of Ireland players
Scottish football managers
Lincoln City F.C. managers
London XI players
Expatriate association footballers in the Republic of Ireland
Association football forwards
Place of death missing
Outfield association footballers who played in goal
Footballers from Manchester
Anglo-Scots
FA Cup Final players